2010–11 Belarusian Cup was the twentieth season of the Belarusian annual cup competition. Contrary to the league season, it was conducted in a fall-spring rhythm. The first games were played on 23 July 2010. Winners of the Cup qualify for the UEFA Europa League third qualifying round.

First round
32 teams started the competition in this round: 12 teams from the First League, 16 teams from Second League (all but DSK-2 Gomel and Gomel-2, both of which are reserve teams for First League clubs) and 4 amateur clubs. 4 First League clubs that were at the top of league table at the moment of the drawings (Gomel, Volna Pinsk, Granit Mikashevichi and DSK Gomel) and all 12 Premier League teams received a bye to the next round. Matches of this round were played on 23 and 24 June 2010.

Round of 32
The winners from the First Round were drawn against those clubs that received a bye to this round. The matches were played on 17 and 18 July 2010. The game involving BATE Borisov was rescheduled to July 7 due to team's participation in UEFA Champions League.

Round of 16
Unlike few previous seasons, this round was played as a single-legged ties. The games were played on 22 September, 27 October and 27 November 2010.

Quarterfinals
The first legs were played on 1 and 2 March 2011 and the second legs on 5 and 6 March 2011.

|}

First leg

Second leg

Semifinals
The first legs will be played on 13 March 2011 and the second legs on 20 March 2011.

|}

First leg

Second leg

Final

See also
 2010 Belarusian Premier League

External links
 Official website 
 Results on Statistiks 

2010–11 domestic association football cups
Cup
Cup
2010-11